The Ramakrishna Vivekananda Center of New York is a branch of the Ramakrishna Order of India, founded in 1933 by Swami Nikhilananda. After Nikhilananda's death in 1973, the center was headed by Swami Adiswarananda until the latter's death in 2007. Currently, Swami Yuktatmananda heads the center.

The center has a temple in New York City and the summer cottage at Thousand Island Park, New York; it publishes a number of seminal books on Vedanta, written or translated by Swami Nikhilananda, many of which were first published by mainstream publishers, including The Gospel of Sri Ramakrishna, the first complete and best-known translation of Sri Sri Ramakrishna Kathamrita in 1942.

The current spiritual head of the organization(Belur Math) is Swami Smaranananda, which encompasses the twin organizations Ramakrishna Math and Ramakrishna Mission.

List of publications
The Gospel of Sri Ramakrishna, the first complete and best-known translation of Sri Sri Ramakrishna Kathamrita
Holy Mother, a biography of Sri Sarada Devi
The Upanishads in four volumes, translations of eleven major Upanishads
The Bhagavad Gita
Self Knowledge: Atmabodha, a translation of Atmabodha of Sri Shankaracharya
Hinduism: Its Meaning for the Liberation of the Spirit
Man in Search of Immortality: Testimonials from the Hindu Scriptures
Vivekananda: A Biography
Vivekananda: The Yogas & Other Works

Notes

External links
 Ramakrishna-Vivekananda Center, main website
 Ramakrishna-Vivekananda Center, resource website

Hindu organizations based in the United States
Ramakrishna Mission
Organizations based in New York (state)
Religious organizations established in 1933
1933 establishments in New York (state)